is a Japanese politician of the New Komeito Party, a member of the House of Representatives in the Diet (national legislature). He was born in Sakai, Osaka but grew up in Saitama Prefecture. A graduate of Kyoto University, he worked as a doctor in Kyoto for ten years. In 1993, he was elected to the House of Representatives for the first time.

References

External links 
 Official website in Japanese.

1958 births
Living people
People from Sakai, Osaka
Kyoto University alumni
20th-century Japanese physicians
Members of the House of Representatives (Japan)
New Komeito politicians
21st-century Japanese politicians